Jendarata Airport  is a private airport located in the Jendarata town of Bagan Datuk District, Perak, Malaysia and near of the Hutan Melintang, Perak, MALAYSIA. The airport is owned and operated by the plantation company, United Plantations, which started their venture into plantations with the opening of the estate in 1906.

There are no scheduled flights into this airport; it is used by private aeroplanes and all operations require prior permission from the company.

See also
 List of airports in Malaysia

References

Airports in Perak
Bagan Datuk District